Zonorchis komareki is a fluke in the genus Zonorchis. It is known to infect the cotton mouse (Peromyscus gossypinus), marsh rice rat (Oryzomys palustris), and eastern harvest mouse (Reithrodontomys humulis) in the eastern United States.

See also
List of parasites of the marsh rice rat

References

Literature cited
McKeever, S. 1971. Zonorchis komareki (McIntosh, 1939) (Trematoda: Dicrocoeliidae) from Reithrodontomys humulis (Audubon and Bachman). The Journal of Parasitology 57(4):865.

Animals described in 1939
Plagiorchiida